Lawrence Keating (June 13, 1899 – August 26, 1963) was an American actor best known for his roles as Harry Morton on The George Burns and Gracie Allen Show, which he played from 1953 to 1958, and next-door neighbor Roger Addison on Mister Ed, which he played from 1961 until his death in 1963.

Early years
Keating was born in St. Paul, Minnesota.

Career
On April 6, 1937, Keating created Professor Puzzlewit, a quiz program on KMJ radio in Fresno, California, and Blue Network west coast network. He also was the program's quizmaster.

Keating was an announcer for NBC in the 1940s, an announcer for ABC radio's This Is Your FBI from 1945 to 1953, and a regular on the short-lived series The Hank McCune Show. Keating was the longest of several actors to play neighbor Harry Morton on The George Burns and Gracie Allen Show. Keating took over the role of Harry Morton from Fred Clark in 1953 and continued in this role on the short-lived sequel, The George Burns Show.

During his first episode on The Burns and Allen Show, George Burns stopped the action just before Harry's entrance and explained that Clark had left the show. Then he introduced Larry Keating to Bea Benaderet who played Blanche Morton saying, "This is Larry Keating and he is going to be your husband now". The pair greeted and complimented each other on their previous work. George remarked that if they are going to be so nice to each other, no one will believe they are married.

Keating played Roger Addison, the next door neighbor (of Wilbur Post, who was played by Alan Young) on the television series Mister Ed from 1961 until his death in 1963.
 
Keating's film credits include The Mating Season (1951), When Worlds Collide (1951), Monkey Business (1952), and Inferno (1953).

Death
Keating was diagnosed with leukemia in February 1963 while Season 3 of Mister Ed was in production. Despite his illness, Keating returned to the series when filming began for the fourth season that summer. He filmed three episodes for Season 4 and worked up to the week before his death on August 26, 1963. His final movie role was in The Incredible Mr. Limpet. He is entombed in Portland, Oregon's Mount Calvary Cemetery.

Complete filmography

Song of the Sarong (1945) as Larry Keating aka Potter
Whirlpool (1949) as Mr. Simms (uncredited)
Dancing in the Dark (1949) as Board Member (uncredited)
When Willie Comes Marching Home (1950) as Gen. G. "Larry" Reeding (uncredited)
Mother Didn't Tell Me (1950) as Doctor Tracy (uncredited)
Ma and Pa Kettle Go to Town (1950) as Police Lt. Klein (uncredited)
I Was a Shoplifter (1950) as Harry Dunson
Stella (1950) as Gil Wright (uncredited)
Three Secrets (1950) as Mark Harrison
My Blue Heaven (1950) as Doctor (uncredited)
Mister 880 (1950) as James F. Lee - Skipper's Attorney (uncredited)
Right Cross (1950) as Second Reporter
The Mating Season (1951) as Mr. Kalinger, Sr.
Follow the Sun (1951) as Sportswriter Jay Dexter
Bright Victory (1951) as Jess Coe
Francis Goes to the Races (1951) as Head Steward
When Worlds Collide (1951) as Dr. Cole Hendron
Bannerline (1951) as Stambaugh
Come Fill the Cup (1951) as Julian Cuscaden
Too Young to Kiss (1951) as Danny Cutler
The Light Touch (1951) as Mr. R.F. Hawkley
About Face (1952) as Col. Long
Glory Alley (1952) as Philip Louis Bennson (uncredited)
Carson City (1952) as William Sharon
Monkey Business (1952) as G.J. Culverly
Something for the Birds (1952) as Roy Patterson
Above and Beyond (1952) as Maj. Gen. Vernon C. Brent
She's Back on Broadway (1953) as Mitchell Parks
Inferno (1953) as Dave Emory
A Lion Is in the Streets (1953) as Robert L. Castleberry IV
Give a Girl a Break (1953) as Felix Jordan
Gypsy Colt (1954) as Wade Y. Gerald
Daddy Long Legs (1955) as Ambassador Alexander Williamson
The Eddy Duchin Story (1956) as Leo Reisman
The Best Things in Life Are Free (1956) as Winfield Sheehan
The Wayward Bus (1957) as Elliott Pritchard
The Buster Keaton Story (1957) as Larry Winters
Stopover Tokyo (1957) as High Commissioner
Who Was That Lady? (1960) as Parker
Boys' Night Out (1962) as Mr. Bingham
The Incredible Mr. Limpet (1964) as Admiral P.P. Spewter

References

External links

1890s births
1963 deaths
American male film actors
American male television actors
Deaths from cancer in California
Deaths from leukemia
Male actors from Saint Paul, Minnesota
Burials in Oregon
20th-century American male actors
Burials at Mount Calvary Cemetery (Portland, Oregon)
Radio and television announcers